Events from the year 1989 in North Korea.

Incumbents
Premier: Yon Hyong-muk 
Supreme Leader: Kim Il-sung

Events

1–8 July 1989: 13th World Festival of Youth and Students in Pyongyang

Births

 5 January - Kim Kuk-jin.
 9 March - Hong Un-jong.
 19 April - Kim Jong.

References

 
North Korea
1980s in North Korea
Years of the 20th century in North Korea
North Korea